Brachmia planicola is a moth in the family Gelechiidae. It was described by Edward Meyrick in 1932. It is found in Tamil Nadu, India.

References

Moths described in 1932
Brachmia
Taxa named by Edward Meyrick
Moths of Asia